The Debt Conciliation Board (DCB) is the independent organ of the Government of Haryana for the implementation of The Haryana Relief Of Agricultural Indebtness Act, 1989. It plays an important role in identifying the deserving candidates for providing relief and adequate benefits to them as per regulations.

History
In 2007 Budget the central government passed the law of waiving agricultural loans to the tune of 60,000 crore, and to distribute this relief the debt conciliation boards were set up by the Haryana government. The board was formed on 28 January 2007 by Chief Minister of Haryana BS Hooda. It was formed to provide relief from huge debts to the poor farmers and labourers of Haryana. First it was decided to constitute a single board for the state of Haryana. But due to the presence of large population of benefitors it was decided to constitute this board in every district of Haryana.

Hierarchy
The board in each district is presided by Additional Deputy Commissioner. The District Revenue Officer and a representative of the financial institutions are the other official members. Further there are two non official Government representatives from each district of Haryana.
Non Official Members are as follows:

Provisions in law
The boards have been constituted under the Haryana Relief of Agricultural Indebtedness Act. Though the Act was enacted in 1989, the boards have been constituted to make the Act really effective. The boards have the jurisdiction to provide relief to debtors of not only a cooperative bank, cooperative society, nationalised bank or commercial bank, but also to the debtors of private creditors and money-lenders. Any debtor, who has paid more than double the principal amount, can approach the board. Section 3 (e) and 4 of the Act under which these boards were constituted provided rescheduling of the debts of farmers with regard to the repayment capacity of the debtor. Section 12 (5) provided that in case the debtor has repaid to the creditor an amount equal to or exceeding double the principal amount, or the debtor on being apprised of such findings pays an amount which makes total repayment equal to double the amount of principal, the board shall have the power to declare the debt as fully discharged.

Criticism

DCB has been often criticised for being ineffective in providing relief to the deserving candidates in Haryana. It has been alleged that the main reason behind the lackadaisical attitude of the government on this issue was that most political leaders had their own commission agent shops in various grain markets of the state and hence they acted as moneylenders to farmers.

See also 
 Debt bondage in India

References

Dispute resolution
State agencies of Haryana
Agricultural finance in India
Debt bondage in India
2007 establishments in Haryana
Agriculture in Haryana